Canon’s A series is Canon's amateur series of manual focus 35 mm single lens reflex cameras.  The first camera, the AE-1, was introduced in April 1976 while the final camera, the AL-1, was released in March 1982.  All have a Canon FD lens mount compatible with Canon's extensive range of manual-focus lenses.

 Canon AE-1 (April 1976)
 Canon AT-1 (December 1976)
 Canon A-1 (April 1978)
 Canon AV-1 (May 1979)
 Canon AE-1 Program (April 1981)
 Canon AL-1 (March 1982)

References 

A Series